The Urban Hymnal is a 2022 debut album by Tennessee State University (TSU) marching band Aristocrat of Bands (AOB).

Recording and release
The album came about when Sir the Baptist visited the TSU campus and saw AOB performing. He suggested that he could record the group during an artist residency, and the recording took place on campus, with final editing being completed in mid-2022. Dallas Austin came in to produce the album with Sir. Word spread in the Gospel music community, leading to several established pop Gospel artists appearing on the album, as well as faculty and staff of the university. The Album was nominated for two Grammy Awards at the 65th Annual Grammy Awards (2023), winning both the Best Roots Gospel Album category and Best Spoken Word album for their collaboration on Poet J. Ivy's  The Poet Who Sat by the Door . The band promoted the album by performing at the half-time show of a Tennessee Titans game.

Reception
Jewly Hight of WNXP named this the album of the week for September 27, 2022, praising the showmanship on the recording and how difficult it is to capture on record.

Track listing
"Turner’s Overture – I’m So Glad" – 1:02
"Dance Revival" – 3:06
"FLY (Y.M.M.F.)" – 3:28
"Going Going" – 3:21
"Alright" – 3:58
"Me Too" – 5:15
"Jesus Loves Me" – 1:16
"Purpose" – 4:16
"Blessings on Blessings" – 3:58
"Alma Mater" – 1:59

Personnel
Aristocrat of Bands

Guest artists
Dallas Austin on "Dance Revival", production
Jamal Bryant on "Alright"
Jekalyn Carr on "Dance Revival"
ChurchPpl on "Dance Revival", "Going Going", "Me Too", "Purpose", and "Blessings on Blessings"
Dubba-AA on "Going Going" and "Purpose"
San Franklin on "Purpose"
Glenda Glover on "Turner’s Overture – I’m So Glad"
Edward L. Graves on "Alma Mater"
Derrick Greene on "Alma Mater"
Fred Hammond on "Me Too"
J. Ivy on "Alright"
Larry Jenkins on "Alright" and "Alma Mater", production
John P. Kee on "Alright", "Me Too"
Donald Lawrence on "Blessings on Blessings"
Reginald McDonald on "Alma Mater"
James Sexton on "Alma Mater"
Kierra Sheard on "Going Going"
Sir the Baptist on "Dance Revival", "Going Going", "Alright", "Me Too", "Purpose", and "Blessings on Blessings"; production
Mekayla Smith on "Alright"
W. Crimm Singers on "Me Too"
Louis York on "Blessings on Blessings"

See also
List of 2022 albums

References

2022 albums
Albums produced by Dallas Austin
Albums produced by Sir the Baptist
Aristocrat of Bands albums